Rodinsky is a rural locality (a village) in Bakaldinsky Selsoviet, Arkhangelsky District, Bashkortostan, Russia. The population was 81 as of 2010. There are 2 streets.

Geography 
Rodinsky is located 22 km east of Arkhangelskoye (the district's administrative centre) by road. Kizgi is the nearest rural locality.

References 

Rural localities in Arkhangelsky District